Dear Seattle are an Australian indie rock band from the Northern Beaches of Sydney, New South Wales. The band consists of four members: Brae Fisher, Jeremy Baker, Lachlan Simpson, and Josh McKay. They have released two studio albums and two EPs to date. 

The band have performed at many Australian festivals including; Groovin the Moo, Unify Gathering, Festival of the Sun, and Party in the Paddock.

History
Dear Seattle's formed in Sydney in 2013 and band began posting songs on Triple J's Unearthed, which gained them rotation across the Triple J network and helped the band gig their away around the nation finding fans all over the country.

In February 2019, the band released their debut studio album, Don't Let Go, which was produced by James Tidswell (Violent Soho).

In 2019, Dear Seattle covered Missy Higgins "The Special Two" for Triple J's Like a Version.

Discography

Albums

EPs

Singles

Awards

AIR Awards
The Australian Independent Record Awards (commonly known informally as AIR Awards) is an annual awards night to recognise, promote and celebrate the success of Australia's Independent Music sector.

|-
| AIR Awards of 2020
| Don't Let Go
| Best Independent Punk Album or EP
| 
|-

References

Australian indie rock groups
Australian indie pop groups
Musical groups established in 2013
2013 establishments in Australia